Fermentation is a metabolic process that produces chemical changes in organic substrates through the action of enzymes. In biochemistry, it is narrowly defined as the extraction of energy from carbohydrates in the absence of oxygen. In food production, it may more broadly refer to any process in which the activity of microorganisms brings about a desirable change to a foodstuff or beverage. The science of fermentation is known as zymology.

In microorganisms, fermentation is the primary means of producing adenosine triphosphate by the degradation of organic nutrients anaerobically. Humans have used fermentation to produce foodstuffs and beverages since the Neolithic age. For example, fermentation is used for preservation in a process that produces lactic acid found in such sour foods as pickled cucumbers, kombucha, kimchi, and yogurt, as well as for producing alcoholic beverages such as wine and beer. Fermentation also occurs within the gastrointestinal tracts of all animals, including humans.

Industrial fermentation is a broader term used for the process of applying microbes for the large-scale production of chemicals, biofuels, enzymes, proteins and pharmaceuticals.

Definitions and etymology
Below are some definitions of fermentation ranging from informal, general usages to more scientific definitions.
 Preservation methods for food via microorganisms (general use).
 Any large-scale microbial process occurring with or without air (common definition used in industry, also known as industrial fermentation).
 Any process that produces alcoholic beverages or acidic dairy products (general use).
 Any energy-releasing metabolic process that takes place only under anaerobic conditions (somewhat scientific).
 Any metabolic process that releases energy from a sugar or other organic molecule, does not require oxygen or an electron transport system, and uses an organic molecule as the final electron acceptor (most scientific).

The word "ferment" is derived from the Latin verb fervere, which means to boil. It is thought to have been first used in the late 14th century in alchemy, but only in a broad sense. It was not used in the modern scientific sense until around 1600.

Biological role
Along with aerobic respiration, fermentation is a method to extract energy from molecules. This method is the only one common to all bacteria and eukaryotes. It is therefore considered the oldest metabolic pathway, suitable for primeval environmentsbefore plant life on Earth, that is, before oxygen in the atmosphere.

Yeast, a form of fungus, occurs in almost any environment capable of supporting microbes, from the skins of fruits to the guts of insects and mammals to the deep ocean. Yeasts convert (break down) sugar-rich molecules to produce ethanol and carbon dioxide.

Basic mechanisms for fermentation remain present in all cells of higher organisms. Mammalian muscle carries out fermentation during periods of intense exercise where oxygen supply becomes limited, resulting in the creation of lactic acid. In invertebrates, fermentation also produces succinate and alanine.

Fermentative bacteria play an essential role in the production of methane in habitats ranging from the rumens of cattle to sewage digesters and freshwater sediments. They produce hydrogen, carbon dioxide, formate and acetate and carboxylic acids. Then consortia of microbes convert the carbon dioxide and acetate to methane. Acetogenic bacteria oxidize the acids, obtaining more acetate and either hydrogen or formate. Finally, methanogens (in the domain Archea) convert acetate to methane.

Biochemical overview

Fermentation reacts the reduced form of nicotinamide adenine dinucleotide (NADH) with an endogenous, organic electron acceptor. Usually this is pyruvate formed from sugar through glycolysis. The reaction produces oxidized NAD+ and an organic product, typical examples being ethanol, lactic acid, and hydrogen gas (H2), and often also carbon dioxide. However, more exotic compounds can be produced by fermentation, such as butyric acid and acetone. Fermentation products are considered waste products, since they cannot be metabolized further without the use of oxygen.

Fermentation normally occurs in an anaerobic environment. In the presence of O2, NADH, and pyruvate are used to generate adenosine triphosphate (ATP) in respiration. This is called oxidative phosphorylation. This generates much more ATP than glycolysis alone. For this reason, fermentation is rarely used when oxygen is available. However, even in the presence of abundant oxygen, some strains of yeast such as Saccharomyces cerevisiae prefer fermentation to aerobic respiration as long as there is an adequate supply of sugars (a phenomenon known as the Crabtree effect). Some fermentation processes involve obligate anaerobes, which cannot tolerate oxygen.

Although yeast carries out the fermentation in the production of ethanol in beers, wines, and other alcoholic drinks, this is not the only possible agent: bacteria carry out the fermentation in the production of xanthan gum.

Products of fermentation

Ethanol

In ethanol fermentation, one glucose molecule is converted into two ethanol molecules and two carbon dioxide (CO2) molecules. It is used to make bread dough rise: the carbon dioxide forms bubbles, expanding the dough into a foam. The ethanol is the intoxicating agent in alcoholic beverages such as wine, beer and liquor. Fermentation of feedstocks, including sugarcane, maize, and sugar beets, produces ethanol that is added to gasoline. In some species of fish, including goldfish and carp, it provides energy when oxygen is scarce (along with lactic acid fermentation).

Before fermentation, a glucose molecule breaks down into two pyruvate molecules (glycolysis). The energy from this exothermic reaction is used to bind inorganic phosphates to ADP, which converts it to ATP, and convert NAD+ to NADH. The pyruvates break down into two acetaldehyde molecules and give off two carbon dioxide molecules as waste products. The acetaldehyde is reduced into ethanol using the energy and hydrogen from NADH, and the NADH is oxidized into NAD+ so that the cycle may repeat. The reaction is catalyzed by the enzymes pyruvate decarboxylase and alcohol dehydrogenase.

Lactic acid

Homolactic fermentation (producing only lactic acid) is the simplest type of fermentation. Pyruvate from glycolysis undergoes a simple redox reaction, forming lactic acid. Overall, one molecule of glucose (or any six-carbon sugar) is converted to two molecules of lactic acid:
C6H12O6 → 2 CH3CHOHCOOH
It occurs in the muscles of animals when they need energy faster than the blood can supply oxygen. It also occurs in some kinds of bacteria (such as lactobacilli) and some fungi. It is the type of bacteria that convert lactose into lactic acid in yogurt, giving it its sour taste. These lactic acid bacteria can carry out either homolactic fermentation, where the end-product is mostly lactic acid, or heterolactic fermentation, where some lactate is further metabolized to ethanol and carbon dioxide (via the phosphoketolase pathway), acetate, or other metabolic products, e.g.:
C6H12O6 → CH3CHOHCOOH + C2H5OH + CO2
If lactose is fermented (as in yogurts and cheeses), it is first converted into glucose and galactose (both six-carbon sugars with the same atomic formula):
C12H22O11 + H2O → 2 C6H12O6
Heterolactic fermentation is in a sense intermediate between lactic acid fermentation and other types, e.g. alcoholic fermentation. Reasons to go further and convert lactic acid into something else include:
 The acidity of lactic acid impedes biological processes. This can be beneficial to the fermenting organism as it drives out competitors that are unadapted to the acidity. As a result, the food will have a longer shelf life (one reason foods are purposely fermented in the first place); however, beyond a certain point, the acidity starts affecting the organism that produces it.
 The high concentration of lactic acid (the final product of fermentation) drives the equilibrium backwards (Le Chatelier's principle), decreasing the rate at which fermentation can occur and slowing down growth.
 Ethanol, into which lactic acid can be easily converted, is volatile and will readily escape, allowing the reaction to proceed easily. CO2 is also produced, but it is only weakly acidic and even more volatile than ethanol.
 Acetic acid (another conversion product) is acidic and not as volatile as ethanol; however, in the presence of limited oxygen, its creation from lactic acid releases additional energy. It is a lighter molecule than lactic acid, forming fewer hydrogen bonds with its surroundings (due to having fewer groups that can form such bonds), thus is more volatile and will also allow the reaction to proceed more quickly.
 If propionic acid, butyric acid, and longer monocarboxylic acids are produced, the amount of acidity produced per glucose consumed will decrease, as with ethanol, allowing faster growth.

Hydrogen gas

Hydrogen gas is produced in many types of fermentation as a way to regenerate NAD+ from NADH. Electrons are transferred to ferredoxin, which in turn is oxidized by hydrogenase, producing H2. Hydrogen gas is a substrate for methanogens and sulfate reducers, which keep the concentration of hydrogen low and favor the production of such an energy-rich compound, but hydrogen gas at a fairly high concentration can nevertheless be formed, as in flatus.

For example, Clostridium pasteurianum ferments glucose to butyrate, acetate, carbon dioxide, and hydrogen gas: The reaction leading to acetate is:

C6H12O6 + 4 H2O → 2 CH3COO− + 2 HCO3− + 4 H+ + 4 H2

Other
Other types of fermentation include mixed acid fermentation, butanediol fermentation, butyrate fermentation, caproate fermentation, acetone–butanol–ethanol fermentation, and glyoxylate fermentation.

In the broader sense
In food and industrial contexts, any chemical modification performed by a living being in a controlled container can be termed "fermentation". The following do not fall into the biochemical sense, but are called fermentation in the larger sense:

Alternative protein 

Fermentation can be used to make alternative protein sources. It is commonly used to modify existing protein foods, including plant-based ones such as soy, into more flavorful forms such as tempeh and fermented tofu.

More modern "fermentation" makes recombinant protein to help produce meat analogue, milk substitute, cheese analogues, and egg substitutes. Some examples are:
 Recombinant myoglobin for faux meat (Motif Foodworks)
 Recombinant leghemoglobin for faux meat (Impossible Foods)
 Recombinant whey for dairy replacement (Perfect Day)
 Recombinant egg white (EVERY)

Heme proteins such as myoglobin and hemoglobin give meat its characteristic texture, flavor, color, and aroma. The myoglobin and leghemoglobin ingredients can be used to replicate this property, despite them coming from a vat instead of meat.

Enzymes 
Industrial fermentation can be used for enzyme production, where proteins with catalytic activity are produced and secreted by microorganisms. The development of fermentation processes, microbial strain engineering and recombinant gene technologies has enabled the commercialization of a wide range of enzymes. Enzymes are used in all kinds of industrial segments, such as food (lactose removal, cheese flavor), beverage (juice treatment), baking (bread softness, dough conditioning), animal feed, detergents (protein, starch and lipid stain removal), textile, personal care and pulp and paper industries.

Modes of industrial operation
Most industrial fermentation uses batch or fed-batch procedures, although continuous fermentation can be more economical if various challenges, particularly the difficulty of maintaining sterility, can be met.

Batch
In a batch process, all the ingredients are combined and the reactions proceed without any further input. Batch fermentation has been used for millennia to make bread and alcoholic beverages, and it is still a common method, especially when the process is not well understood. However, it can be expensive because the fermentor must be sterilized using high pressure steam between batches. Strictly speaking, there is often addition of small quantities of chemicals to control the pH or suppress foaming.

Batch fermentation goes through a series of phases. There is a lag phase in which cells adjust to their environment; then a phase in which exponential growth occurs. Once many of the nutrients have been consumed, the growth slows and becomes non-exponential, but production of secondary metabolites (including commercially important antibiotics and enzymes) accelerates. This continues through a stationary phase after most of the nutrients have been consumed, and then the cells die.

Fed-batch

Fed-batch fermentation is a variation of batch fermentation where some of the ingredients are added during the fermentation. This allows greater control over the stages of the process. In particular, production of secondary metabolites can be increased by adding a limited quantity of nutrients during the non-exponential growth phase. Fed-batch operations are often sandwiched between batch operations.

Open
The high cost of sterilizing the fermentor between batches can be avoided using various open fermentation approaches that are able to resist contamination. One is to use a naturally evolved mixed culture. This is particularly favored in wastewater treatment, since mixed populations can adapt to a wide variety of wastes. Thermophilic bacteria can produce lactic acid at temperatures of around 50 °Celsius, sufficient to discourage microbial contamination; and ethanol has been produced at a temperature of 70 °C. This is just below its boiling point (78 °C), making it easy to extract. Halophilic bacteria can produce bioplastics in hypersaline conditions. Solid-state fermentation adds a small amount of water to a solid substrate; it is widely used in the food industry to produce flavors, enzymes and organic acids.

Continuous
In continuous fermentation, substrates are added and final products removed continuously. There are three varieties: chemostats, which hold nutrient levels constant; turbidostats, which keep cell mass constant; and plug flow reactors in which the culture medium flows steadily through a tube while the cells are recycled from the outlet to the inlet. If the process works well, there is a steady flow of feed and effluent and the costs of repeatedly setting up a batch are avoided. Also, it can prolong the exponential growth phase and avoid byproducts that inhibit the reactions by continuously removing them. However, it is difficult to maintain a steady state and avoid contamination, and the design tends to be complex. Typically the fermentor must run for over 500 hours to be more economical than batch processors.

History of the use of fermentation

The use of fermentation, particularly for beverages, has existed since the Neolithic and has been documented dating from 7000 to 6600 BCE in Jiahu, China, 5000 BCE in India, Ayurveda mentions many Medicated Wines, 6000 BCE in Georgia, 3150 BCE in ancient Egypt, 3000 BCE in Babylon, 2000 BCE in pre-Hispanic Mexico, and 1500 BC in Sudan. Fermented foods have a religious significance in Judaism and Christianity. The Baltic god Rugutis was worshiped as the agent of fermentation.

In 1837, Charles Cagniard de la Tour, Theodor Schwann and Friedrich Traugott Kützing independently published papers concluding, as a result of microscopic investigations, that yeast is a living organism that reproduces by budding. Schwann boiled grape juice to kill the yeast and found that no fermentation would occur until new yeast was added. However, a lot of chemists, including Antoine Lavoisier, continued to view fermentation as a simple chemical reaction and rejected the notion that living organisms could be involved. This was seen as a reversion to vitalism and was lampooned in an anonymous publication by Justus von Liebig and Friedrich Wöhler.

The turning point came when Louis Pasteur (1822–1895), during the 1850s and 1860s, repeated Schwann's experiments and showed fermentation is initiated by living organisms in a series of investigations. In 1857, Pasteur showed lactic acid fermentation is caused by living organisms. In 1860, he demonstrated how bacteria cause souring in milk, a process formerly thought to be merely a chemical change. His work in identifying the role of microorganisms in food spoilage led to the process of pasteurization.

In 1877, working to improve the French brewing industry, Pasteur published his famous paper on fermentation, "Etudes sur la Bière", which was translated into English in 1879 as "Studies on fermentation". He defined fermentation (incorrectly) as "Life without air", yet he correctly showed how specific types of microorganisms cause specific types of fermentations and specific end-products.

Although showing fermentation resulted from the action of living microorganisms was a breakthrough, it did not explain the basic nature of fermentation; nor, prove it is caused by microorganisms which appear to be always present. Many scientists, including Pasteur, had unsuccessfully attempted to extract the fermentation enzyme from yeast.

Success came in 1897 when the German chemist Eduard Buechner ground up yeast, extracted a juice from them, then found to his amazement this "dead" liquid would ferment a sugar solution, forming carbon dioxide and alcohol much like living yeasts.

Buechner's results are considered to mark the birth of biochemistry. The "unorganized ferments" behaved just like the organized ones. From that time on, the term enzyme came to be applied to all ferments. It was then understood fermentation is caused by enzymes produced by microorganisms. In 1907, Buechner won the Nobel Prize in chemistry for his work.

Advances in microbiology and fermentation technology have continued steadily up until the present. For example, in the 1930s, it was discovered microorganisms could be mutated with physical and chemical treatments to be higher-yielding, faster-growing, tolerant of less oxygen, and able to use a more concentrated medium. Strain selection and hybridization developed as well, affecting most modern food fermentations.

See also

References

External links

 Works of Louis Pasteur Pasteur Brewing.
 The chemical logic behind fermentation and respiration

 
Anaerobic digestion
Oenology

Brewing
Food science
Metabolism
Food preservation
Alchemical processes
Mycology
Catalysis